The Aftenstjernesø Formation is a geologic formation in Greenland. It preserves fossils dating back to the Cambrian period.

See also

 List of fossiliferous stratigraphic units in Greenland

References
 

Cambrian Greenland
Cambrian southern paleotemperate deposits
Cambrian southern paleotropical deposits